Wardak may refer to:

People
 Abdul Ahad Wardak, Afghan politician
 Abdul Rahim Wardak, Afghan politician
 Abdullah Wardak, Afghan politician
 Abdul Qayum Wardak, Afghan politician
 Ahmed Wardak, Afghan-born German cricketer
 Amin Wardak, Afghan mujahideen leader 
 Ghulam Farooq Wardak, Afghan politician
 Ghulam Sediq Wardak, Afghan inventor
 Kazimierz Wardak, Polish runner
 Zakia Wardak, Afghan architect, politician, and businesswoman

Other
 Wardak (Pashtun tribe)
 Maidan Wardak Province, Afghanistan
 Chak Wardak District, Afghanistan
 Tangi Valley AKA Wardak Valley or Tangi Wardak, in Maidan Wardak Province

Arabic-language surnames